Vladimir Rostislavovich Gardin (born Vladimir Rostislavovich Blagonravov (Благонра́вов);  – 28 May 1965) was a pioneering Russian film director and actor who strove to raise the artistic level of Russian cinema.

He first gained renown as a stage actor in the adaptations of Russian classics by Vera Komissarzhevskaya and other directors. In 1913, he turned to cinema and started producing screen versions of great Russian fiction: Anna Karenina (1914), The Kreutzer Sonata (1914), Home of the Gentry (1914), War and Peace (1915, co-directed with Yakov Protazanov), and On the Eve (1915).

After the Russian Revolution of 1917, he organized and presided over the first film school in the world, now known as VGIK. With the advent of sound pictures, he stopped directing and returned to acting. His roles won him a high critical acclaim and the title of People's Artist of the USSR (1947). Gardin published two volumes of memoirs in 1949 and 1952. Another book, The Artist's Life and Labor, followed in 1960.

Selected filmography
director
 The Keys to Happiness (1913); co-directed with Yakov Protazanov
 Days of Our Life (1914)
 Anna Karenina (1914)
 The Kreutzer Sonata (1914)
 A Nest of Noblemen (1914)
 War and Peace (1915)
 Petersburg Slums (1915); co-directed with Yakov Protazanov
 Ghosts (1915)
 Thought (1916)
 The Iron Heel (1919)
 Hunger... Hunger... Hunger (1921)
 Sickle and Hammer (1921)
 A Spectre Haunts Europe (1923)
 Locksmith and Chancellor (1923)
 Cross and Mauser (1925)
 Gold Reserves (1925)
 The Marriage of the Bear (1926)
 The Poet and the Tsar (1927)
 Kastus Kalinovskiy (1928)

actor
 Sniper (1931)
 Beethoven Concerto (1936)
 Pugachev (1937)
 Stepan Razin (1939)
 Russian Ballerina'' (1947)

References

External links

1877 births
1965 deaths
20th-century Russian male actors
20th-century screenwriters
People from Tver
People from Tver Governorate
Honored Artists of the RSFSR
People's Artists of the RSFSR
People's Artists of the USSR
Recipients of the Order of the Red Banner of Labour
Russian male stage actors
Russian male film actors
Russian male silent film actors
Silent film directors
Russian film directors
Soviet film directors
Soviet screenwriters
Male screenwriters
Soviet male film actors
Belarusfilm films
Male actors from the Russian Empire
Soviet theatre directors
Academic staff of the Gerasimov Institute of Cinematography
Burials at Bogoslovskoe Cemetery